The Islamic University of Applied Sciences Rotterdam (IUASR) is a vocational university founded in 1997. It is a member of the Federation of the Universities of the Islamic World. The Islamic University of Applied Sciences Rotterdam received her first accreditation in 2010 for her master's degree programme Islamic Spiritual Care (Chaplaincy) and in 2013 for Bachelor program Islamic Theology; both degree programmes are accredited by the  NVAO (the official accreditation organisation of the Netherlands and Flanders). According to a news article from 2010 the university has close religious ties with the Turkish Nurcu movement.
The IUASR offers accredited Bachelors and master's degrees and is called Islamic University of Applied Sciences Rotterdam; the IUASR is not a member of the VSNU (association of Dutch universities), due to the fact that there is slight difference in the names 'University of Applied Sciences' and 'University' pointing to the distinction between having a PhD research programme or not. In this sense the wording 'University' is protected by law. However, the IUASR is starting a PhD application in January 2019 at the NVAO. This does not inhibit the IUASR and its accredited degree programmes.

Location 
From 2003 the university is located in the North of Rotterdam, in a characteristic stately building on the Bergsingel 135. The building previously belonged to Zadkine MLO and provided practical science education and was known as van 't Hof Instituut.

Education 
The IUASR has the legal accreditation as an institute of Higher Education. In June 2010 the master's degree programme Islamic Spiritual Care (2 years) was accredited at University of Applied Sciences level, in March 2013 accreditation was given to the Bachelor programme Islamic Theology (4 years). The IUASR has 15 academicians of whom 40% PhD, 50% Masters and 10% Bachelor's degree. The University is not ranked yet starts the application process with the NVAO in January 2019 for a PhD research programme. As of now, the IUASR is building a new team for this new research programme. The IUASR is also a member of the Erasmus+ Mobility programme.

Funding 
The institute is not a true (PhD / research) university in the official Dutch sense at this moment. It is a private school, and thus has no state funding and is mostly reliant on donations. "These have been forthcoming from private individuals, foundations and Turkish religious entrepreneurs, most of them part of the personal contact network of principal Prof. Dr. A. Akgündüz".

References

External links 
 

Islam in the Netherlands
Islamic universities and colleges
Universities in the Netherlands
1997 establishments in the Netherlands
Educational institutions established in 1997
Islamic education in the Netherlands